Edward H. "Eddie" Booth (Born: Brooklyn, New York) was an American Major League Baseball player, who played as a right fielder for four teams during his five-year professional baseball career.

Personal life
There is nothing concrete about when he was born or died, but Peter Morris indicates that there is a possible match, a strong candidate who died in New York City on December 21, 1928, hasn't been able to prove that he’s the same man.

References

External links

19th-century baseball players
Sportspeople from Brooklyn
Baseball players from New York City
Major League Baseball right fielders
Middletown Mansfields players
Brooklyn Atlantics players
Elizabeth Resolutes players
New York Mutuals players
Year of birth unknown
Year of death unknown
Columbus Buckeyes (minor league) players